HK Rapid is a former ice hockey team based in Kyiv, Ukraine.

History
The club was formed in 2015, first by the name Generals Kyiv-2, as the team was planned to act as a farm team for Generals Kyiv. The company Prag Car (official dealer of Škoda in Ukraine) won a tender for the right to name the team, giving the name HK Rapid to the team.

The only season (2015-16) of the club ended with a sixth place (out of eight teams) during the regular season. The team thereby missed the playoffs.

References 

Ice hockey teams in Ukraine
Sport in Kyiv
Ice hockey clubs established in 2015
2015 establishments in Ukraine